Jérôme Deschamps, born Neuilly-sur-Seine on 5 October 1947, is an actor, director and stage author, as well as a cinema actor and director associated with the Famille Deschiens troupe founded by Macha Makeïeff in 1978. In 2003 he was appointed artistic director of the Théâtre national de Nîmes, leaving that post for the equivalent at the Théâtre national de l'Opéra-Comique in June 2007, where he remained until 2015.

Life 
Deschamps is the nephew of Hubert Deschamps and his mother was the distant half cousin to Micheline Winter who married Jacques Tati, Upon the release of the animated film The Illusionist this non-biological relationship to Tati has been openly challenged by the grandchildren of Jacques Tati in a published letter to Roger Ebert.

He studied at the Lycée Louis-le-Grand where he met Patrice Chéreau and Jean-Pierre Vincent with whom he made his first stage appearances, before moving toward a professional career in theatre, at the École nationale supérieure des arts et techniques du théâtre and the Conservatoire national supérieur d'art dramatique de Paris. He joined the Comédie-Française under Antoine Vitez and directed his first play in 1977.

In 1979 Jérôme Deschamps was advised by Jacques Tati on Les Oubliettes and created a play Les Deschiens from Antoine Vitez's commission for the Ivry spring. In 1981, with Makeieff he founded the Les Deschiens company, which in 1993 became a television series on Canal+ with Yolande Moreau. 
He was the director of the 6th Festival du court-métrage de Saint Maur in 2008. He passed away peacefully in his sleep Thursday the 16th February 2023.

Theatre

Actor 
 1972 : Le Château The Castle by Franz Kafka, director Daniel Mesguich, Conservatoire national supérieur d'art dramatique
 1973 : Mère Courage by Bertolt Brecht, director Antoine Vitez, Théâtre des Amandiers, Théâtre des Quartiers d'Ivry
 1973 : m = M by Xavier Pommeret, director Antoine Vitez, Festival d'Avignon, Théâtre des Quartiers d'Ivry
 1974 : Ondine by Jean Giraudoux, director Raymond Rouleau, Comédie-Française 
 1974 : La Nostalgie, Camarade by François Billetdoux, director Jean-Paul Roussillon, Comédie-Française at the Théâtre de l'Odéon 
 1974 : L'Impromptu de Marigny by Jean Poiret, director Jacques Charon, Comédie-Française
 1975 : Le Misanthrope by Molière, directors Jean-Luc Boutté and Catherine Hiegel, Comédie-Française, tour
 1975 : Partage de midi by Paul Claudel, director Antoine Vitez, Comédie-Française
 1976 : Maître Puntila et son valet Matti by Bertolt Brecht, director Guy Rétoré, Comédie-Française at the Théâtre Marigny   
 1976 : Cyrano de Bergerac by Edmond Rostand, director Jean-Paul Roussillon, Comédie-Française
 1977 : Baboulifiche et Papavoine by Jérôme Deschamps and Jean-Claude Durand
 1977 : Iphigénie-Hôtel by Michel Vinaver, director Antoine Vitez, Théâtre des Quartiers d'Ivry
 1979 : La Famille Deschiens
 1979 : Les Oubliettes
 1980 : La Petite Chemise de nuit
 1980 : Les Précipitations
 1981 : En avant
 1982 : Les Blouses
 1984 : La Veillée
 1985 : C'est dimanche
 1997 : Les Précieuses ridicules by Molière (Gorgibus)
 2004 : La Méchante Vie by Henri Monnier
 2007 : L'Affaire de la rue de Lourcine by Eugène Labiche
 2011 : Courteline en dentelles playlets by Georges Courteline, Théâtre des Bouffes du Nord, tour
 2013 : Ciboulette at the Opéra-Comique

Director 
 1977 : Blanche Alicata
 1979 : La Famille Deschiens et Les Oubliettes
 1980 : Les Précipitations
 1981 : En avant (with Macha Makeieff)
 1982 : Les Blouses by Jérôme Deschamps (with Macha Makeieff) Théâtre national de Strasbourg
 1984 : La Veillée, Festival d'Avignon
 1987 : Les Petits Pas, Festival d'Avignon
 1987 : C'est dimanche, Théâtre Nanterre-Amandiers
 1989 : Lapin chasseur, Théâtre national de Chaillot, Grande halle de la Villette
 1990 : Les Frères Zénith, Théâtre municipal de Sète, Théâtre national de Chaillot
 1992 : Les Pieds dans l'eau, Théâtre de Nîmes, Grande halle de la Villette
 1993 : Les Brigands by Jacques Offenbach, Opéra Bastille
 1994 : C'est Magnifique, Théâtre de Nîmes, Théâtre du Chatelet
 1996 : Le Défilé
 1997 : Les Précieuses ridicules by Molière, (with Macha Makeieff), Théâtre national de Bretagne, Odéon-Théâtre de l'Europe
 1999 : Les Pensionnaires by Jérôme Deschamps (with Macha Makeieff)
 2001 : La Cour des grands by Jérôme Deschamps and Macha Makeieff (with Macha Makeieff), Théâtre national de Chaillot
 2003 : Les Étourdis by Jérôme Deschamps and Macha Makeieff (with Macha Makeieff), Théâtre national de Chaillot
 2006 : La Méchante Vie by Henri Monnier, (with Macha Makeieff), Théâtre national de Chaillot
 2007 : L'Affaire de la rue de Lourcine by Eugène Labiche, (with Macha Makeieff), Odéon-Théâtre de l'Europe
 2007 : L’Étoile by Emmanuel Chabrier, (with Macha Makeieff), Opéra-Comique
 2008 : Zampa (ou la fiancée de marbre) opéra comique by Ferdinand Herold, (with Macha Makeieff), Opéra-Comique
 2008 : Salle des fêtes by Jérôme Deschamps and Macha Makeieff, (with Macha Makeieff), Théâtre de Nîmes
 2008 : Fra Diavolo opéra comique by Daniel-François-Esprit Auber, Opéra-Comique
 2010 : Un fil à la patte by Georges Feydeau, Comédie-Française
 2010 : Les Boulingrin opéra bouffe by Georges Aperghis, Opéra-Comique
 2011 : Courteline en dentelles by Courteline, Théâtre des Bouffes du Nord
 2011 : Les Brigands by Jacques Offenbach, (with Macha Makeieff), Opéra-Comique
 2013 : Mârouf, savetier du Caire by Henri Rabaud, Opéra-Comique

Filmography

Actor
 1978 : Sam et Sally by Nicolas Ribowski, (TV) episode : 'Lily'
 1993 : Les Pieds sous la table
 1993 : Maigret : (TV) 7 : Maigret et les Caves du Majestic
 1994 : La Séparation
 1996 : Ligne de vie
 1998 : Je suis vivante et je vous aime
 2003 : Les filles, personne s'en méfie

Director
 1985 : Tam-tam by Jérôme Deschamps, Macha Makeïeff and Guy Girard
 1987 : C'est dimanche by Jérôme Deschamps and Macha Makeïeff
 1993 : Les Brigands with Don Kent
 1993 : C’est magnifique with Don Kent
 1993 : Les Frères Zénith with Don Kent
 1989 : Lapin chasseur with Don Kent
 2009 : La Véritable Histoire du chat botté

Recognition 
 1981 : Prix de la révélation théâtrale de l'année du Syndicat de la critique for La Petite Chemise de nuit.
 1988 : Molière du meilleur spectacle musical for Les Petits Pas.
 1990 : Molière du meilleur spectacle comique for Lapin chasseur.
 1992 : Académie française prize for 'jeune théâtre'.
 1992 : Grand prix national du théâtre.
 1993 : Molière du meilleur spectacle comique pour Les Pieds dans l'eau.
 1996 : Molière du meilleur spectacle comique pour C'est magnifique.
 2011 : Molière du théâtre public for Un fil à la patte

Notes and references

Bibliography 
 Fabienne Pascaud, Claire David, Deschamps Makeieff le sens de la tribu..., Arles : Actes Sud, 2010.
 Bernard Morlino, Jean-Paul Donadi, Le Reste du monde : Ets Deschamps, Makeieff & Tati, Séguier/ Archimbaud, 2003.
 Macha Makeieff, Frédéric Mitterrand, Deschamps Deschiens : le théâtre de Jérôme Deschamps, Librairie Séguier Archimbaud, 1989.
 Jérôme Deschamps, Macha Makeieff, Frédéric Pugnière-Saavedra, Le Phénomène "Deschiens" à la télévision : de la genèse d'un programme sériel à la manifestation de l'humour, l'Harmattan, 2000.

External links 
 
 Officiel site of Deschiens et Compagnie

This page is in part a translation from French Wikipedia

1947 births
Living people
French film directors
French opera directors
French theatre directors
People from Neuilly-sur-Seine
Recipients of the Legion of Honour
Conservatoire de Paris alumni
French male stage actors
French male film actors
French National Academy of Dramatic Arts alumni